Olha Mikolayivna Huzenko (born 17 July 1956) is a Ukrainian rower who competed for the Soviet Union in the 1976 Summer Olympics.

In 1976 she was a crew member of the Soviet boat which won the silver medal in the eights event.

External links
 profile

1956 births
Living people
Russian female rowers
Ukrainian female rowers
Soviet female rowers
Olympic rowers of the Soviet Union
Rowers at the 1976 Summer Olympics
Olympic silver medalists for the Soviet Union
Olympic medalists in rowing
Medalists at the 1976 Summer Olympics